Françoise Nyssen (born 9 June 1951) is a French-Belgian publisher and politician and a former director of the Actes Sud publishing house. From 2017 until 2018, she served as Minister of Culture of France in the government of Prime Minister Édouard Philippe.

Early life and education 
Françoise Nyssen was raised and attended university in Belgium. She has a maîtrise (Master's degree) from the Institut supérieur d’urbanisme et de rénovation urbaine in Brussels.

Career
Early in her career, Nyssen worked first as an urban planner in Paris.

In 1987, Nyssen became an associate and presiding director of Actes Sud publisher, founded by her father Hubert Nyssen, and located in Arles. Françoise Nyssen and her husband founded the school Domaine du possible in 2014, using Steiner-Waldorf paedagogical methods. The school settled in a farm a few kilometers away from the centre of Arles, where a hundred pupils, aged from 3 to 16, were enrolled in September 2016.

On 17 May 2017, Nyssen was appointed as French Minister of Culture, as the successor of Audrey Azoulay. On 13 November 2017, she announced the launch of a new fund to support young designers with  €300,000 to be invested in 10 projects annually.

During her time in office, Nyssen was accused of impropriety over renovations done in her previous publishing house’s outpost in Arles in 2011. Shortly after, the public prosecutor’s office in Paris launched a preliminary investigation into Nyssen, after French weekly Le Canard Enchaîné reported that she had failed to declare building renovations in her prior career as a publisher. In October 2018, she was replaced by Franck Riester in a cabinet reshuffle.

Other activities

Corporate boards
 EuropaCorp, Independent Member of the Board of Directors (2012-2017) 
 Société Marseillaise de Crédit (SMC), Member of the Supervisory Board

Non-profit organizations
 Rencontres d'Arles, Member of the Board of Directors (-2017)

References 

1951 births
Living people
French Ministers of Culture
French publishers (people)
Officiers of the Légion d'honneur
Université libre de Bruxelles alumni
Commanders of the Ordre national du Mérite
Commandeurs of the Ordre des Arts et des Lettres
People from Etterbeek
French people of Belgian descent
Women government ministers of France
21st-century French politicians
21st-century French women politicians